The South Fork American River is a major tributary of the American River in El Dorado County, California, draining a watershed on the western slope of the Sierra Nevada east of Sacramento. The river begins in pristine Desolation Wilderness and flows through the Sierra Nevada foothills. The river at Coloma was the site of James Marshall's discovery of gold at Sutter's Mill on January 24, 1848, which started the California Gold Rush. The South Fork of the American is "the most popular recreation stream in the West" for whitewater rafting in North America, e.g., 80,000 visitors in 2011. Professional whitewater rafting companies have been offering commercial rafting trips on the South Fork American River since 1978.

Geography
The North Fork American River also flows into the lake, and the combined rivers form the American River proper, which flows from the dam southwest to a confluence with the Sacramento River.

Major tributaries include Silver Creek, Rock Creek, Weber Creek, and Silver Fork American River. The river also contributes about a third of the total outflow of the American River system.

Discharge

Recreation

Rafting and kayaking

The South Fork of the American has approximately eight sections of boatable whitewater ranging from class II to class V. The most commonly run section of river is the class III stretch between Chili Bar Dam and Folsom Lake.

This 20 mile section is best divided into two days of boating, from Chili Bar to Coloma (Chili Bar) and  Coloma to Folsom Lake (The Gorge). Established boating and river rescue skills are required to run this section of river. Those with inadequate river skills can enjoy this section of river by booking a rafting trip with one of the many companies in the Coloma valley.

For those wishing to practice their boating skills without having to face the more challenging class III rapids it is possible boat a shorter class II  section from Coloma to Greenwood Creek (known as the C-G) .

Meandering through the Sierra foothills this 20 mile section of river has a lot to offer. Thanks to the efforts of local communities and advocacy groups the riperean eco-system of the South Fork remains despite the destructive effects of the gold rush and other developments. The river is home to a wide array of flora and fauna such as bald eagles, golden eagles, beaver and river otter. In Spring the hillsides of the upper Chili Bar section are adorned with stunning California poppies and other wild flowers. There are also interesting historical sights on the river such as grinding holes made by the Nisenan people that once inhabited the area and diversion channels blasted out during the gold rush.

Hiking, mountain biking and horse riding

There is BLM land located off Highway 49  on the way to Auburn from Coloma with great hiking, biking and equestrian trails. Parking and use is free and it is a great way to experience the South Fork of the American River.

These BLM managed areas are part of a 20-year joint effort with the American River Conservancy to protect the habitat and beauty of the South Fork of the American River. Accessible via Cronin Ranch, Magnolia Ranch and Salmon Falls the trails are "stunning every season of the year. Winter rains bring lush green landscapes that cultivate spring’s abundant wildflowers. The summer’s golden hills contrast with the oak woodlands that lead you through fragrant sage-covered ridge tops. The fall colors reflecting against the river take one’s breath away. The trail represents the foothills’ various healthy ecosystems including grasslands, oak woodland, chaparral and riparian habitats. The trail is a wonderful place to retreat and reconnect with nature."
.

Dams
There are two dams on the South Fork proper: Slab Creek Dam, which forms Slab Creek Reservoir near Camino, and Chili Bar Dam, located north of Placerville. Both are run-of-the-river dams serving mainly for hydroelectricity production. Other major dams in the South Fork basin include ones at Union Valley Reservoir and Ice House Reservoir on the Silver Creek drainage. Most of the dams and reservoirs in the basin are operated by the Sacramento Municipal Utility District (SMUD) as part of the 688 megawatt Upper American River Project and Pacific Gas and Electric as part of the Chili Bar Project.

See also

References

Rivers of El Dorado County, California
Tributaries of the Sacramento River
Rivers of Northern California